A Kiss So Deadly is a 1996 made-for-television thriller directed by Chuck Bowman.

Cast

 Charles Shaughnessy as Tom Deese
 Dedee Pfeiffer as Catherine Deese
 Tom Bresnahan as Todd Gale
 Noelle Parker as June Stern
 Kerrie Keane as Addy Deese
 Charlotte Ross as Amanda Blake
 Scott Simpson as Stalker
 Jeffrey Pillars as Ray
 Robert Catrini as Craig
 Paul Sincoff as Officer Cruz
 Tim Gardner as Officer Chaso
 Nina Repeta as Waitress
 Jeff Hochendoner as Bartender
 William Gregory Lee as Adam
 Steve Posner as Professor
 Michael Genevie as Det. Ron Marin
 Hank Troscianiec as First Cop
 Brian Keith Gamble (credited as Brian Gamble) as Second Cop
 Julián Vicente as Detective
 Barry Bell as Condo Supervisor

Crew
 Directed by Chuck Bowman
 Written by Nevin Schreiner (story and teleplay) and Monica Parker (story)
 Produced by Chuck Bowman, Jennifer Alward (executive producer) and Jill Proctor (associate producer)
 Music by Joseph Conlan
 Cinematography by Karl Herrmann
 Edited by Jonathon Braun

Plot
Tom Deese (Charles Shaughnessy) falls in love with his daughter's roommate, Amanda (Charlotte Ross), and becomes the focus of his daughter Catherine's (Dedee Pfeiffer) suspicions when Amanda is murdered.

Reception
Variety film critic Tony Scott, wrote that Shaughnessy ‘doesn’t do much convincing’ and that his former Days of Our Lives co-star Ross fared better, giving her character ‘an easygoing, even sympathetic, quality.’ He also noted Pfeiffer's ‘intelligent face’ and felt that Simpson ‘turns in the best scene of the production when he rasps into a phone.’ Scott added that the production was technically sound, but faults were the result of Schreiner's ‘absurd script.’

References

External links
 

1996 films
1996 thriller films
American thriller television films
Films directed by Chuck Bowman